Lasionycta phaea is a moth of the family Noctuidae. It is an arctic species and has been collected from Baffin Island in north-eastern Canada to the central Brooks Range in northern Alaska and southward along the west coast of Hudson Bay to Arviat, Nunavut.

Adults are diurnal and occur on wet tundra. Adults are on wing from late June to mid-July.

External links
A Revision of Lasionycta Aurivillius (Lepidoptera, Noctuidae) for North America and notes on Eurasian species, with descriptions of 17 new species, 6 new subspecies, a new genus, and two new species of Tricholita Grote

Lasionycta
Moths of North America
Insects of the Arctic
Moths described in 1905